A bark hack is a tool used to remove pine tree bark to promote the flow of pine resin, which is used in naval stores production. The tool consists of a wooden shaft with a weighted butt and hook-like, replaceable, U-shaped blades at the head.  

The bark hack is swung much like an axe and is used to create a hatched chevron pattern ("cat face" or less frequently, a "blaze") into trees' exposed sapwood. The weighted end helps the operator follow through with the force necessary for the hooked blade to scoop out chips of hard pine wood.

External links
image

Woodworking hand tools
Forestry tools

The first sentence is basically correct except that the blade is straight rather than curved.  With the bark hack, only the bark is removed; it does not cut into the wood as the wood hack did.  The wood hack was used up until the early 1950s and the trees were "chipped or streaked" each week during the sap flow season.  With the bark hack, only the bark was removed and a 50% sulfuric acid solution was sprayed on the "streak" and it had to be done only every 2 weeks.